Walewice may refer to the following places:
Walewice in Łódź Voivodeship (central Poland)
Walewice, Bełchatów County in Łódź Voivodeship (central Poland)
Walewice, Lubusz Voivodeship (west Poland)